Kala/Balge is a Local Government Area of Borno State, Nigeria. It is the easternmost LGA of Nigeria. It has itd headquarters  in the town of Rann.

Landscape 
 
It has an area of 1,896 km

Population 
and a population of 60,797 at the 2006 census.

Postal Code 
The postal code of the area is 611.

History 
It is one of the sixteen LGAs that constitute the Dikwa Emirate, a traditional state located in Borno State, Nigeria.

Insurgency 
On May 14, 2014, local civilian vigilantes repelled a raid by the terrorist group Boko Haram, killing over 200 militants. On May 31, 500 Boko Haram terrorists returned and overwhelmed the vigilantes killing 40.

References

Local Government Areas in Borno State